Athous alpestris is a species of click beetle of the family Elateridae found at elevations of  in the mountains of Karachay-Cherkessia.

References 

Beetles described in 1994
Beetles of Asia
Dendrometrinae